The Court of Common Council is the primary decision-making body of the City of London Corporation. It meets nine times per year. Most of its work is carried out by committees. Elections are held at least every four years. It is largely composed of independent members although the number of Labour Party Common Councilmen in 2017 grew to five out of a total of 100. In October 2018, the Labour Party gained its sixth seat on the Common Council with a by-election victory in Castle Baynard ward.
The most recent election was in 2022.

History
The first common council was elected in 1273 with 40 members, in 1347 the number was increased to 133, and from later in the same century (states as during the reign of King Edward III) it was increased to 206. The members were elected annually in December.

The council has later been reduced to 100 members, and is now elected every fourth year.

Court of Common Council elected March 2017

References

Politics of the City of London
City of London Corporation